Vadym Postovoy (born 30 August 1967) is a former Ukrainian football defender.

Player career
Vadym Postovoy, started his career in Dynamo Kyiv and he also played in clubs like FC Nyva Ternopil, FC Desna Chernihiv, FC Tekstylnyk Chernihiv, FC Spartak Ivano-Frankivsk, FC Torpedo Minsk, FC Shakhtyor Soligorsk. In 1998 he moved to FC Cheksyl Chernihiv another team in the city of Chernihiv where he played 8 matches and scoring 7 goals. In 1999 he returned to Desna Chernihiv and he has been appointed captain of the club.

Coach career

FC Chernihiv
Vadym Postovoy in 2006, he was appointed as the coach of FC Chernihiv, the second main club of Chernihiv just promoted in Ukrainian Second League for the season 2020–21. On 21 April 2021 he was appointed as coach of Yunist Chernihiv part of the academy of FC Chernihiv.

Honours

As Player
Karpaty Lviv
Soviet Second League: 1991 (Zone West)

As Coach
FC Chernihiv
 Chernihiv Oblast Football Championship: 2019
 Chernihiv Oblast Football Cup: 2012'''

References

External links
 Profile on Official website of FC Chernihiv

1967 births
Living people
Soviet footballers
Ukrainian footballers
Association football defenders
Ukrainian expatriate footballers
Expatriate footballers in Belarus
FC Dynamo Kyiv players
FC Nyva Ternopil players
FC Desna Chernihiv players
FC Skala Stryi (1911) players
FC Cheksyl Chernihiv players
FC Dnipro Cherkasy players
FC Oleksandriya players
FC Spartak Ivano-Frankivsk players
FC Papirnyk Malyn players
FC Torpedo Minsk players
FC Shakhtyor Soligorsk players
Ukrainian football managers
FC Chernihiv managers
FC Desna Chernihiv captains
Sportspeople from Zhytomyr Oblast